Charles Todd may refer to:

 Caroline and Charles Todd, American mystery novelists
 Charles Burr Todd (1849–1928), American historian
 Charles Edward Todd  (1858–1917), son of Charles Todd (pioneer), medical doctor in Adelaide
 Charles Haukes Todd, Chief Commissioner of the British Crown Colony of Burma, 1887–1890
 Charles Hawkes Todd (1784–1826), president of the Royal College of Surgeons in Ireland
 Charles Lafayette Todd (1911–2004), American folklorist
 Charles Leonard Todd (1871-1932), American businessman, farmer, and politician
 Charles Stewart Todd (1791–1871), United States army officer and ambassador
 Charles Todd (pioneer) (1826–1910), Australian astronomer and builder of telegraph lines
 Charles Todd (industrialist) (1868–1942), New Zealand businessman
 Charlie Todd, founder of Improv Everywhere
 Chuck Todd (born 1972), political correspondent